Inocenta Corvea (born 28 December 1953) is a Cuban basketball player. She competed in the women's tournament at the 1980 Summer Olympics.

References

1953 births
Living people
Cuban women's basketball players
Olympic basketball players of Cuba
Basketball players at the 1980 Summer Olympics
Place of birth missing (living people)